Gary Tan may refer to:
 Gary Tan (swimmer, born 1982)
 Gary Tan (swimmer, born 1973)